Randy DuBurke (born 1962) is an American artist best known as the author and illustrator of the Steptoe Award winning book The Moon Ring (2003) and as the illustrator of Yummy: the Last Days of a Southside Shorty (2010). He previously worked as a comic book artist in the 1980s and 1990s.

Early life
Randy DuBurke was born in Washington, Georgia in 1962. He graduated from New York Technical College with a graphic arts degree.

Career
DuBurke made his debut in the comics industry with the story "A Life in the Day" as part of the DC Comics Bonus Book program in Doom Patrol vol. 2 #9 (June 1988). He drew the "Black Canary" feature in Action Comics Weekly in 1988 and contributed to the various volumes of Paradox Press' The Big Book Of series from 1994 to 2000. In the early 2000s, he began working in the field of children's books and his The Moon Ring received the Steptoe Award in 2003. DuBurke collaborated with writer Andy Helfer on Malcolm X: A Graphic Biography (2006) which has been recommended as part of a "Suggested Core List of Graphic Novel Titles for High School Students". Writer Greg Neri and DuBurke produced Yummy: the Last Days of a Southside Shorty in 2010 about the life of Robert "Yummy" Sandifer. The book was praised by Publishers Weekly, Booklist, and Kirkus Reviews. The School Library Journal noted that "Playing not just with expressions and characters but with light and shadow as well, it's DuBurke's choices that lift this book up and make it far more compelling than it would be merely on its own." As of 2014, DuBurke was working on a graphic novel with jazz saxophonist Wayne Shorter. The graphic novel was included with Shorter's Emanon album released in August 2018.

Personal life
DuBurke resides in Switzerland with his wife and children.

Bibliography

Books
 The Moon Ring 36 pages, 2003, 
 Just For You!: The Bravest Girls In The World (written by Olivia George) 32 pages, 2004, 
 Halloween Night on Shivermore Street (written by Pam Pollack and Meg Belviso) 32 pages, 2004, 
 Catching the Moon: The Story of a Young Girl's Baseball Dream (written by Crystal Hubbard) 32 pages, 2005, 
 Little Mister 22 pages, 2006, 
 When It's Six O'Clock in San Francisco: A Trip Through Time (written by Cynthia Jaynes Omololu) 32 pages, 2009, 
 Yummy: the Last Days of a Southside Shorty (written by Greg Neri), 96 pages, 2010, 
 Best Shot in the West: The Adventures of Nat Love (written by Patricia McKissack and Fredrick McKissack) 129 pages, 2012, 
 Game Changer: John McLendon and the Secret Game (written by John Coy) 32 pages, 2015,

Comic books

DC Comics

 Action Comics #609–616, 624–634 (Black Canary); #750 (Superman) (1988–1999)  
 Checkmate #33  (1991)  
 Doom Patrol vol. 2 #9, Annual #1 (1988)  
 The Flash Secret Files and Origins #1 (1997) 
 Flinch #7 (1999)  
 Green Arrow vol. 2 #7, Annual #2 (1988–1989)  
 JLA Gallery #1 (1997)
 JLA Secret Files and Origins #2 (1998) 
 Justice League Quarterly #17 (1994)
 Martian Manhunter Special #1 (1996)
 New Gods Secret Files and Origins #1 (1998) 
 Showcase '96 #6–7 (Firestorm) (1996)  
 Weird War Tales vol. 2 #1 (1997)
 Who's Who in the DC Universe #10 (1991)
 Wonder Woman Gallery #1 (1996)
 Wonder Woman Secret Files and Origins #1 (1998)

Eureka Productions
 Graphic Classics – African-American Classics #22 (2011)

Farrar, Straus and Giroux
 Malcolm X: A Graphic Biography #1 (2006)

Marvel Comics
 Tales of the Marvels: Inner Demons #1 (1996)

Paradox Press

 The Big Book Of Bad (1998) 
 The Big Book Of Conspiracies (1995)
 The Big Book Of Death (1995) 
 The Big Book Of Freaks (1996)
 The Big Book Of Grimm (1999)
 The Big Book Of Hoaxes (1996)
 The Big Book Of Little Criminals (1996)
 The Big Book Of Losers (1997)
 The Big Book Of Martyrs (1997)
 The Big Book Of Scandal (1997)
 The Big Book Of The 70s (2000)
 The Big Book Of the Unexplained (1997)
 The Big Book Of the Weird Wild West (1998)
 The Big Book Of Thugs (1996)
 The Big Book Of Urban Legends (1994)
 The Big Book Of Vice (1999)
 The Big Book Of Weirdos (1995)
 Gangland #2  (1998)
 Hunter's Heart #1–3 (1995)

Awards and recognitions
He earned the following awards for Yummy: the Last Days of a Southside Shorty:
 the Simon Wiesenthal Center Museum of Tolerance Once Upon A World Children's Book Award
 2011 YALSA Top 10 Quick Picks
 2011 IRA Notable Book for a Global Society
 Chicago Public Library - Best Informational Books for Older Readers of 2010
 Cynsational Books of 2010

He earned the following awards for Best Shot in the West:
 2012 BCCB Blue Ribbon Book
 2013 Bank Street CBC Best Children's Book of the Year.
 2013 Society of Illustrators of Los Angeles Silver Award

References

External links

 
 Randy DuBurke at Graphic Classics
 Randy DuBurke at Mike's Amazing World of Comics

1962 births
20th-century African-American artists
20th-century American artists
21st-century African-American artists
21st-century American artists
American children's book illustrators
American children's writers
American comics artists
American expatriates in Switzerland
Artists from Georgia (U.S. state)
DC Comics people
Living people
People from Washington, Georgia